The 1958 Men's European Volleyball Championship was the fifth edition of the event, organized by Europe's governing volleyball body, the Confédération Européenne de Volleyball. It was hosted in Prague, Czechoslovakia from August 30 to September 11, 1958.

Teams

Final ranking

References
 Results(  2009-07-21)

Mens European Volleyball Championship, 1958
1958 in Czechoslovak sport
International volleyball competitions hosted by Czechoslovakia